Charlos may refer to:

People
Natalia Charlos, Polish long-distance swimmer
Charlos Gary (born 1968), American cartoonist

Places
Charlos Cove, Nova Scotia, community in Nova Scotia, Canada
Charlos Heights, Montana, unincorporated community in the United States

See also

Charlot (name)
Charls